Vilayat-e Faqih   (also velāyat-e faqīh),  is Persian for guardianship of Faqīh (an Islamic jurist)

For the doctrine, see the Guardianship of the Islamic Jurist
For the Vilayat-e Faqih (Guardianship of the Islamic Jurist) in the Islamic Republic of Iran, see the Supreme Leader of Iran
For the current Vali-e-Faqih (Guardian Jurist) of Iran, see Ayatollah Ali Khamenei
For the book by Ayatollah Ruhollah Khomeini establishing the doctrine of faqih as ruler, see Islamic Government: Governance of the Jurist